Shanglin County is a county of Guangxi Zhuang Autonomous Region, China, it is under the administration of the prefecture-level city of Nanning, the capital of Guangxi. It borders the prefecture-level city of Laibin to the northeast.

Climate

References

External links 

Counties of Guangxi
Nanning